The 2020–21 season is New Basket Brindisi's 29th in existence and the club's 3rd consecutive season in the top tier Italian basketball.

Overview

Kit 
Supplier: Adidas / Sponsor: Happy Casa

Basketball Champions League

Serie A

Players

Current roster

Depth chart

Squad changes

In

|}

Out

|}

Confirmed 

|}

Froum youth team 

|}

Coach

Competitions

Supercup

Italian Cup 
Brindisi qualified to the 2021 Italian Basketball Cup by ending the first half of the LBA season in the 2nd position. They played the quarterfinal against the 7th ranking Allianz Pallacanestro Trieste.

Serie A

Regular season

Playoffs

Quarterfinals

Semifinals

Champions League

Regular season

Play-offs

See also 

 2020–21 LBA season
 2020–21 Basketball Champions League
 2021 Italian Basketball Cup
 2020 Italian Basketball Supercup

References 

2020–21 Basketball Champions League
2020–21 in Italian basketball by club
New Basket Brindisi